The Onyx Hotel Tour (billed as The Onyx Hotel Tour 2004) was the fifth concert tour by American entertainer Britney Spears. It showcased her fourth studio album, In the Zone (2003), and visited North America and Europe. A tour to promote the album was announced in December 2003. Its original name was the In the Zone Tour, but Spears was sued for trademark infringement and banned from using the name.
Spears felt inspired to create a show with a hotel theme which she later mixed with the concept of an onyx stone. The stage,  inspired by Broadway musicals, was less elaborate than her previous tours. The setlist was composed mostly by songs from In the Zone as well as some of her past songs reworked with different elements of jazz, blues, and Latin percussion. Tour promoter Clear Channel Entertainment marketed the tour to a more adult audience than her previous shows, while sponsor MTV promoted the tour heavily on TV shows and the network's website.

The tour was divided into seven segments: Check-In, Mystic Lounge, Mystic Garden, The Onyx Zone, Security Cameras, Club, and the encore. Check-In displayed performances with dance and advanced in the hotel theme. Mystic Lounge featured an homage to Cabaret and other musicals, while remixing some of Spears's early hits. Mystic Garden displayed a jungle-inspired stage. The Onyx Zone displayed a ballad performance with acrobats. Security Cameras was the raciest part of the show, with Spears and her dancers emulating different sexual practices. Club displayed a performance with urban influences. The encore consisted of a system malfunction interlude and Spears performed wearing a red ensemble. The tour received generally favourable reviews from contemporary critics, who praised it for being an entertaining show while criticizing it for looking "more [like] a spectacle than an actual concert".

The Onyx Hotel Tour was commercially successful. According to Billboard, the 25 shows in North America grossed nearly $19 million with 300,460 tickets and $34 million with 601,040 tickets sold in 52 of 53 shows worldwide. According to Pollstar, The Onyx Hotel Tour sold 641,428 tickets in 2004. On June 6, 2004, Spears performed for 25,367 fans at RDS Arena in Dublin with $1,359,648 gross. The four nights at Wembley Arena in London grossed $2,179,820 with 41,823 tickets sold. In March, Spears suffered a knee injury onstage which forced her to reschedule two shows. In June, Spears fell and hurt her knee again during a music video shoot. She underwent arthroscopic surgery and the remainder of the tour was canceled. In 2005, Spears sued her insurance companies for denying her a reimbursement for the cancellation. Showtime broadcast live the March 28, 2004 show at the American Airlines Arena, in a special titled Britney Spears Live from Miami. Backstage footage was included in the reality show Britney and Kevin: Chaotic.

Background

On December 2, 2003, Spears announced through her official website US concerts to support her fourth studio album, In the Zone (2003). The tour would kick off on March 2 in San Diego, California, at iPayOne Center. However, Spears released a statement saying, "I'm especially looking forward to bringing my tour to new markets and performing in front of fans that may not have had the opportunity to see any of my previous tours." On January 12, 2004, four dates were announced in Glasgow, Manchester, London and Birmingham, her first UK dates in four years. After the beginning of the North American leg, Spears announced a summer leg in the United States in June as well as a European leg starting on April 27 in London and ending on June 5 at Rock in Rio Lisboa. It was also rumored to visit Latin America and Asia later in the year. The Onyx Hotel Tour was originally going to be called In the Zone Tour. On February 17, 2004, a San Diego clothing manufacturer of the same name sued Spears for $10 million and banned her from using the trademark. On May 17, 2004, a hotel named Onyx Hotel opened in Boston, Massachusetts. Kimpton Hotels & Restaurant Group had come up with the name two years before the tour was developed. Spears and the Kimpton group decided to promote the hotel by featuring a room named The Britney Spears Foundation Room. It was designed by Spears's mother, Lynne, reflecting Spears's personality and taste. The room opened six weeks later and a portion of the fee was destined to the Britney Spears Foundation.

Development

The show was majorly inspired by Broadway musicals, primarily focused on Grand Hotel, which was directed by Tommy Tune and portrayed a day in the life of the Berlin Grand Hotel in 1928. Spears said the hotel theme was inspired by having traveled so much, and was merged with the onyx stone concept. The tour was described as a "unique, mysterious hotel powered by an onyx stone, where guests who enter shine their own light into the gemstone and make their fantasies come to life. It's a vibrant, whimsical place where wondrous dreams are realized, and the darkest of secrets are revealed". Spears also stated about the tour,
"I would love my audience to walk out of the auditorium feeling like they had the most magical experience of their life. The onyx stone is kind of symbolic of what guides me in my life, like there's a bigger picture in everything, and there's something that guides you where you need to go, from point A to point B".
Kevin Tancharoen was chosen as the tour director. He said about the development of the tour, "Coming from a movie lovers' background, I wanted to make it seem like a film. A little Joel Schumacher meets Tim Burton". He further explained that the onyx stone symbolized untapped desire. The stage was less elaborate than her previous tour, Dream Within a Dream Tour, with no runway extended towards the audience, in order to keep the show faithful to the New York theatre theme. There were three video screens above the stage. Also present were several LED columned-shaped video screens in the stage. The setlist was mostly composed from songs from In the Zone ("Early Mornin'" and "Brave New Girl" being the only songs of the album to not be on the tour). Other songs included were "Boys", "I'm a Slave 4 U" and "Overprotected" from Britney (2001). Also included were three of her early hits, "...Baby One More Time", "(You Drive Me) Crazy" and "Oops!... I Did It Again", reworked with elements of jazz and blues. The promotional photos for the tour were by Markus Klinko and Indrani. Tour promoter Clear Channel Entertainment marketed the tour to an entirely different demographic than her previous tours, changing from families and children to a more adult audience. The show was also targeted to the gay market. Promotional campaigns included were Flash animated e-mails targeted to two million people who fitted the audience description. The tour was also advertised in several radio stations and TV shows for those audiences, such as The O.C. MTV was chosen as the tour sponsor. The sponsorship was extended to advertisements in the tickets and interactive promotions in MTV.com, such as exclusive downloads, streaming video and ticket and merchandise auctions benefiting the Britney Spears Foundation. Three episodes of TRL were dedicated to a behind-the-scenes special. Vice president of music marketing and promotion Joe Armenia talked about the sponsorship,
"There are not that many artists that appeal to every territory with an MTV channel, but Britney Spears is one of the select few. We have been waiting for the opportunity to make a global splash, and the Britney tour is it. For the better part of the rest of the year, we’ll be on the road with Britney. This is more support than we’ve ever given an artist in the U.S., let alone all over the world. We love the association with Britney; she has always been a core part of this channel and our fans love Britney".

Concert synopsis

The show began with a skit where a flamboyant master of ceremonies welcomed spectators to the Onyx Hotel. After this, he took an onyx and threw into the video screens, causing a virtual chandelier to fall into the floor. Spears briefly appeared in the screens, as her dancers descended to the stage. She entered standing on top of a small bus dressed in a black catsuit, where she performed "Toxic". She descended to the stage for the breakdown and then performed "Overprotected". She took a break to talk to the audience, before going into "Boys", which featured the male dancers pushing her while she was standing in luggage carts. "Showdown" featured rainbow-colored lighting effects and was the last song of the first act. A video interlude followed featuring Spears and her friends outside a club. While she was leaving, she noticed a woman dressed in 1930s fashion. She followed her and the woman asked Spears to enter the "Mystic Lounge". Spears reappeared wearing a frilly pink corset to perform "...Baby One More Time". She performed "Oops!... I Did It Again" with a vintage microphone and joined by her background singers. Spears and her dancers performed "(You Drive Me) Crazy", which contained elements of Latin percussion. After this, she talked to the audience and usually referenced her wedding with childhood friend Jason Alexander. She also introduced her band before leaving the stage.

In the next section, there was a video interlude of Spears wearing a flowered-themed dress and entering the "Mystic Garden". As the video ended, she appeared on-stage sitting at a leaf-covered piano. She talked to the audience before performing "Everytime". Her dancers joined her to perform "The Hook Up" and a jungle inspired mix of "I'm a Slave 4 U". The show continued with another video interlude featuring a spoof of paranormal-themed shows, "The Onyx Zone", with the master of ceremonies doing a Rod Serling impression and introducing "The Shadow Room". Spears reappeared sitting on a swing to perform "Shadow". During the performance, Spears was lifted into the air above an M-shaped blue ribbon, with performers twirling in the fabric. The performance ended with Spears leaving the stage while the dancers performed to a ballet interlude in flesh colored costumes. The next section began with a video projection of two guards watching Spears in her room through security cameras. Spears appeared on a smaller stage wearing a white robe and performed "Touch of My Hand" in a transparent bathtub. During the performance, she took the robe off to reveal a nude body suit with crystals that resembled her "Toxic" music video outfit. She left the stage briefly to a wardrobe change and reappeared on the mini platform where she descended to the main stage on a pole, wearing pink lingerie and performed "Breathe on Me" on a bed with one of her male dancers. She then put on a white trench coat and performed "Outrageous", the last song of the act.

In the next act, Spears and her dancers wore street clothes and performed "(I Got That) Boom Boom". After this, she introduced her band and dancers and left the stage. The encore began with a system malfunction where a female voice counted down as the screens sketched Britney's outline, which then rose to reveal Spears at the top of a staircase. After this, "Me Against the Music" (Rishi Rich's Desi Kulcha Remix) began and Spears appeared on stage wearing a red ensemble. The show ended with Spears and her dancers on the staircase where the screen is lowered and Spears made her exit as a shower of confetti was shot towards the audience.

Reception

Critical response

The tour received mixed to positive reviews from critics. Gene Stout of the Seattle Post-Intelligencer called it a "throbbing, special-effects extravaganza". Aline Mendelsohn of The Orlando Sentinel noted influence from Janet Jackson in the show's choreography and  suggestive themes, which had attracted many headlines due to the "heightened sensitivity of the post-Janet Jackson era." MTV UK highlighted the comparisons with early Madonna tours such as The Girlie Show World Tour and added that "[the show] is a theatrical extravaganza, complete with camp compere, sexy dancers, glitzy costumes and extravagant set pieces and its all fabulously raunchy".  Bill Dean of The Ledger reported that the tour was "big sloppy and sex-filled". He also added, "Her presence remains captivating. [...] Perhaps even subsconsciously, the Onyx tour's most significant role may be foretelling a future in Broadway or film musicals". Neil Strauss of The New York Times claimed "her show was more a theater-and-dance spectacle than an actual concert, with the staging equal parts  and the redeveloped Times Square. [...] At times the show seemed more like a Las Vegas tribute to Ms. Spears than a concert by Ms. Spears herself".

Chris Willman of Entertainment Weekly believed that "In Britney, Paul Verhoeven's fantastic notion of the showgirl as superstar has become incarnate. But every showgirl needs a show. The Onyx Hotel tour hardly counts as one, with its arbitrary mishmash of Madonna-esque sex-bomb skits and Cirque du Soleil surrealism". The Seattle Times'''s Pamela Sitt said it "was high on spectacle and low on substance, veering crazily from burlesque to fairy tale to peep show". Doug Elfman of the Las Vegas Review-Journal stated that the tour "is an unfocused bore of false sexuality, horrible songs, trite choreography, unfocused themes and less ambition than a house cat that sits around licking itself all day". Darryl Morden of msnbc.com commented, "at times it was entertaining but overall came off as a variation on the same show she's been doing for several years".

Commercial performance
Tickets sold slower than her previous tours. This was attributed to the change in audience, since her new demographic tended to be "typically a last second ticket purchaser". A month before the tour began, seven dates were already sold out, including the Fresno and Toronto shows. Tour merchandise grossed $4 million on the North American leg alone, with an average of between $150,000 and $170,000 per night. This made Spears the highest-grossing merchandise female artist since she began touring in 1999, with a total gross of more than $30 million. On July 16, 2004, the tour was listed as the eight highest-grossing tour of the first semester of 2004, grossing $19 million. The tour ended up grossing $34 million.

Moline injury
On March 18, 2004, during the Moline, Illinois show at The MARK of the Quad Cities, Spears fell during the performance of "(I Got That) Boom Boom" and injured her knee. She left the stage and returned shortly after wearing a white robe, apologizing to the audience for not being able to deliver the encore performance. A physician examined Spears and indicated that it was not related to a previous knee injury in 1999 during a dance rehearsal. The Rosemont, Illinois show at Allstate Arena, scheduled for March 19, was cancelled. Spears's label Jive Records asked fans to hold on to their tickets until further notice. The Flint Journal reported that the Auburn Hills, Michigan show at The Palace of Auburn Hills was also cancelled. Both shows were rescheduled to the end of the leg in April.

Cancellation and lawsuit

On June 8, 2004, Spears was shooting the music video for "Outrageous" in Manhattan, when she fell and injured her left knee. She was taken immediately to a local hospital, where doctors performed an MRI scan and found floating cartilage. The following day, Spears underwent arthroscopic surgery. She was forced to remain six weeks with a thigh brace, followed by eight to twelve weeks of rehabilitation, which caused any future concerts to be canceled. Jive Records issued a statement saying Spears planned to revisit the cities in the future. On February 4, 2005, Spears filed suit in New York State Supreme Court against eight insurance companies that denied her a reimbursement of $9.8 million. The insurers refused because they claimed Spears did not fully inform them of the 1999 knee injury in the insurance form. Attorney Jonathan Stoler who defended Spears on the case said,
"These are the same insurers who had provided her with policies on [several] tours and they had cleared her and were aware of the previous injury. The alleged omission related to a question whereby Ms. Spears was asked if in the past five years she had had any surgery. Ms. Spears, in all prior circumstances, had indicated she had, but at the time she was going through this application she did answer 'no.' It had not been a full five years, but four years and eleven months since the surgery [in 1999] and even if she had answered in the affirmative, our contention is that it makes no difference".

Broadcast and recordings 
On January 12, 2004, it was announced that Showtime would broadcast live the Miami show at the American Airlines Arena on March 28, in a special titled Britney Spears Live from Miami. It was directed by Hamish Hamilton. A concert promotional video and pictures were shot, in which Spears donned 1920s and 1930s hairstyles. She also wore a long black Roberto Cavalli dress, which was auctioned on eBay; proceeds went to the Britney Spears Foundation. On April 13, 2004, it was reported by MTV that Spears was planning a reality show titled "OnTourage" to document the backstage of the European leg, in a similar way to Madonna's Madonna: Truth or Dare. However, the show was reworked into the reality show Britney and Kevin: Chaotic''. The concert for Rock in Rio Lisboa festival in Lisbon, Portugal, was broadcast live on June 5, 2004.

Opening acts
Kelis (North America) (select venues)
Skye Sweetnam (Europe & North America) (select venues)
JC Chasez (Europe) (select venues)
Wicked Wisdom (Europe) (select venues)

Set list
The following set list is obtained from the March 3, 2004 concert in Glendale, Arizona. It is not intended to represent all shows throughout the tour.

"Check In" 
"Toxic"
"Overprotected" 
"Boys" 
"Showdown"
"Mystic Longue" 
"...Baby One More Time"
"Oops!... I Did It Again"
"(You Drive Me) Crazy"
"Mystic Garden" 
"Everytime"
"The Hook Up"
"I'm a Slave 4 U"
"The Onyx Zone" 
"Shadow"
"Security Cameras" 
"Touch of My Hand"
"Breathe on Me"
"Outrageous"
"Club" 
"(I Got That) Boom Boom"
Encore
"Check Out" 
"Me Against the Music" 

Notes
"Oops... I Did It Again" and "Touch of My Hand" were not performed during the Lisbon concert.

Tour dates

Cancelled shows

Notes

References

2004 concert tours
Britney Spears concert tours